Harihara Mahapatra is an Indian actor, comedian and politician, who mostly works in Odia language films known as Ollywood.

Career
Harihara has worked in Odia films like Dil Tate Deichi (2010), Love Dot Com, Akhire Akhire, Pagala Karichu Tu, Haata Dhari Chaaluthaa. He has also worked in award-winning children's feature film 'Sabas Biju' in 2017 and the film was screened at National Children's Film Festival, Rajasthan and International Children's Film Festival, Hyderabad.

Political career
Harihara had joined the state political party Bhartiya Janata Party (BJP) since 2017.

Filmography

Awards

References

External links
 

Actors from Odisha
Indian male film actors
Indian actor-politicians
Year of birth missing (living people)
Living people